Chilelopsis serena is a species of mygalomorph spiders of Chile, named after its type locality: La Serena, Elqui, Region IV. Males differ from those both C. calderoni and C. puertoviejo in the absence of a patch of setae on the apical tibia I, and also in the palpal tibia having dorsal spines and the bulbal duct being abruptly narrowed at the apex. Females differ from the two other species by their divided spermathecae.

Description
Female: total length ; cephalothorax length , width ; cephalic region length , width ; fovea width ; medial ocular quadrangle length (OQ) , width ; labium length , width ; sternum length , width . Its cephalic region is short, wide and convex, while its fovea is slightly procurved. Its labium possesses 1 cuspule. A serrula is absent. Its well marked sternal sigilla is small, shallow and oval. Chelicerae: rastellum is formed by strong, blunt setae. It possesses a fang furrow with 15 large denticles. Color as in other Chilelopsis, but with the abdominal pattern more marked.
Male: total length ; cephalothorax length , width ; cephalic region length , width ; OQ length , width ; labium length , width ; sternum length , width . Its labium has no cuspules. A serrula is apparently absent. Its well marked sternal sigilla is small, but shallow and oval. Chelicerae: rastellum is formed by thin, long and stiff setae. Its cheliceral tumescence is small, rounded and flat, covered with a few long, thin bristles. Its leg I and tibia have no apophysis nor shield of setae; its metatarsus is bent at ts basal third, protruding backward. Color as in other Chilelopsis.

Distribution
Northern Region IV (Coquimbo Region).

See also
Spider anatomy
List of Nemesiidae species
Regions of Chile

References

External links

ADW entry

Nemesiidae
Spiders of South America
Spiders described in 1995
Endemic fauna of Chile